Wallison Nunes Silva (born 24 June 2001), commonly known as Wallison, is a Brazilian footballer who currently plays for Botafogo B, on loan from Red Bull Brasil.

Career statistics

Club

Notes

References

2001 births
Living people
Brazilian footballers
Brazilian expatriate footballers
Association football defenders
2. Liga (Austria) players
Red Bull Brasil players
FC Liefering players
Brazilian expatriate sportspeople in Austria
Expatriate footballers in Austria
Footballers from São Paulo